Clambus villosus is a species of fringe-winged beetle endemic to Sri Lanka.

Description
This medium-sized species has a body length is about 1.1 mm. Body dark brown in color. Ventrum and clypeus clothed with long, distinct semierect hairy pubescence. Other parts of dorsum is bare and clothed with very short, and fine, dark hairs. Head convex, and eye are large. Body surface is smooth and shiny near the eyes. Pronotum convex with indistinctly shagreened surface. The lateral margins of the elytra is very evenly arcuate. Abdominal sternites are shiny with short pubescence. Anal sternite consists with distinct hairy tufts.

References 

Scirtoidea
Insects of Sri Lanka
Beetles described in 1978